Mikhail Fyodorovich Astangov, real surname Ruzhnikov ( in Warsaw – 20 April 1965 in Moscow) was a Soviet and Russian stage and film actor. People's Artist of the USSR (1955).

Filmography

 The Conveyor of Death (1933) – Prince Sumbatov
 Convict (1936) – Konstantin "Kostya" Dorokhov
 The Oppenheim Family (1939) – Prof. Bernd Vogelsang
 Minin and Pozharsky (1939) – Sigismund III Vasa
 Suvorov (1941) – Count Aleksey Arakcheyev
 Dream (1941) – Stanislav Komorovsky
 Kotovsky (1943) – Prince Karakozen/his son
 The District Secretary (1942) – Nazi Col. Makenau
 The Murderers are Coming (1942) – Franz
 The Young Fritz (1943, short) – Teacher
 Fifteen-Year-Old Captain (1945) – Sebastian Pereira, alias Negoro
 Miklukho-Maklai (1947) – Dr. Brandler
 The Russian Question (1947) – McPherson
 The Third Blow (1948) – General Erwin Jaenecke
 The Battle of Stalingrad (1949) – Adolf Hitler
 They Have a Motherland (1949) – Orphanage chief captain Robert Scott
 Maksimka (1952) – Captain of ship "Betsy", slave dealer
 Sadko (1952) – Maharaja
 Princess Mary (1955) – Dr. Verner
 The Mexican  (1955) – Kelly
 The Hyperboloid of Engineer Garin (1965) – Mr. Rolling
 Going Inside a Storm (1965) – Arkady Borisovich Golitsyn (final film role)

References

External links 
 

1900 births
1965 deaths
20th-century Russian male actors
Male actors from Warsaw
People from Warsaw Governorate
People's Artists of the RSFSR
People's Artists of the USSR
Stalin Prize winners
Recipients of the Order of the Red Banner of Labour
Russian male film actors
Russian male stage actors
Soviet male film actors

Soviet male stage actors
Deaths from peritonitis